Cuthbert Horsley (by 1517 – by 1586), of Horsley, Northumberland, was an English politician.

Education
Horsely was educated at Lincoln's Inn.

Career
He was a Member (MP) of the Parliament of England for Appleby in 1542, Northumberland in October 1553, Newcastle-upon-Tyne in April 1554, Northumberland in November 1554 and 1559, and Morpeth in 1555.

References

16th-century deaths
People from Northumberland
Members of Lincoln's Inn
Year of birth uncertain
English MPs 1542–1544
English MPs 1553 (Mary I)
English MPs 1554
English MPs 1554–1555
English MPs 1555
English MPs 1559
16th-century English politicians
Members of Parliament for Appleby